Landsting elections were held in Denmark on 23 September 1924, with the exception that the electors were elected on 18 September.

Of the seven constituencies the seats representing constituencies number one (Copenhagen), four (Odense and Svendborg County) and six (Hjørring, Aalborg, Thisted, Viborg and Randers County) were up for election.

Results

Notes

References

Elections in Denmark
Denmark
Landsting